van der Bijl is a surname. Notable people with the surname include:

Andrew van der Bijl (born 1928), Dutch Christian missionary
Hendrik van der Bijl (1887–1948), South African engineer and industrialist
Paul Andries van der Bijl (1888–1939), South African mycologist
Pieter van der Bijl (1907–1973), South African cricketer
Vintcent van der Bijl (born 1948), South African cricketer

See also
Van der Byl

Dutch-language surnames
Surnames of Dutch origin